On 10 April 2016 at approximately 03:30 AM IST, the Puttingal Temple in Paravur, Kollam, Kerala, India, experienced an explosion and fire after firework celebrations went awry. As a result, 111 people were killed and more than 350 were injured, including some with severe burns. The temple and at least 150 houses in the area of the temple were damaged by the blast. According to local reports and eyewitnesses, the explosion and fire were caused by sparks from a firecracker being used in a competitive fireworks display igniting fireworks in a concrete storehouse.
The temple did not have permission from Kerala government authorities to conduct a "competitive fireworks display". About 15,000 pilgrims were visiting the temple to mark local Hindu celebrations during the last day of a seven-day festival of the goddess Bhadrakali.

On 13 April, in the aftermath of the event, the Kerala High Court banned the display after sunset of sound-emitting firecrackers in all places of worship in the state.

This was the second major firework disaster reported in the news within southern India in recent years, after the Sivakasi factory explosion in the state of Tamil Nadu on 5 September 2012.
The shrine is administered by a private trust.

Background
Temples in southern India often have festivals with displays of fireworks and firecrackers to appease the female deity. Annual competitions are staged across the state of Kerala for the most spectacular displays. In 1952,68 people were killed after a firecracker explosion at Sabarimala temple.

On 10 April 2016, two groups of devotees set off fireworks while thousands participated in the festival at Puttingal temple. The temple's authorities told police that they had verbal permission from the district authorities. On 12 April, they revealed that, due to safety concerns, the temple had been denied permission, but it proceeded due to pressure from the people.

Fire
The fire took place at approximately 03:30 IST (22:00 UTC) when an explosion occurred in a stash of firecrackers stored in the temple for upcoming Vishu celebrations.  The apparent cause of the explosion was a firework, known locally as Amittu, which fell into the stash after being lit during the firework celebrations. The explosion caused the storage building and adjacent office building to collapse leading to most of the casualties. The blast was felt by people living more than a kilometer away from the temple.

Recovery
The Indian Navy dispatched one Dornier 228 transport aircraft and two helicopters for rescue transport along with medical teams from Headquarters Southern Naval Command (HQSNC), Indian naval air station located in Kochi. The Indian Air Force, Army and Coast Guard were also involved.

The majority of the victims were taken to Thiruvananthapuram Medical College.

Investigation

An investigation was ordered by Ramesh Chennithala, the Home Minister of Kerala. The police plans to take action against the display contractors and the temple administration. On 11 April 2016, five men who worked at the temple were taken into police custody for questioning. During the night of 11 April and into 12 April, the police arrested a further seven people connected with Puttingal temple, including the president.
The Government of India took cognizance of the fateful event and appointed DR.A.K.Yadav, Joint Chief Controller of Explosives, Petroleum and Explosives Safety Organization(PESO) as the inquiry officer vide Government of India order No: 31(03)/2016 -Expl dated 22/04/2016 under section 9(A) of Explosives Act,1884. Dr.R.Venugopal, Deputy Chief Controller of Explosives, PESO, Hyderabad, Dr.K.B.Radhakrishnan, Professor & Head Department of Chemical Engineering, TKM College of Engineering and Shri.G.M Reddy , Joint Chief Controller of Explosives(Retired),PESO were appointed as Assessors in Inquiry by the Government of India . The Inquiry officer issued public notices and press releases regarding the inquiry in leading news papers. Conducted its proceedings by visiting the site of accident, sittings at paravoor and Kollam. The Inquiry commission submitted its report on time The immediate and proximate causes of accident in the report are conducting display without a valid licence by the paravur puttingal dewasom managing committee, Non maintenance of safety distance as required under Explosives Rules 2008 between display site and spectators, use of unauthorized fireworks for display, storage of unauthorized fireworks,Absence of crowd control mechanism, use of prohibited chemicals in the manufacture of display fireworks.

Reactions
Prime Minister of India Narendra Modi wrote on Twitter that the accident was "heart-rending and shocking beyond words" and that he was on his way to visit the area later in the afternoon, as was Chief Minister of Kerala, Oommen Chandy. Kerala state home minister Ramesh Chennithala visited the disaster site. Political parties postponed campaigning for the election to the Kerala Legislative Assembly out of respect. Neighbouring Karnataka offered to send a team but was turned down as Kerala apparently had the requirements.

In the wake of the disaster, the Kerala Disaster Management Authority decided to re-examine the disaster preparedness of the Thrissur Pooram. The Chief Minister of Kerala, Oommen Chandy said that "Permission was never taken for the storage of fireworks inside the Temple."

Movie

Based on this incident as a backdrop, a Malayalam film named Kuttanpillayude Sivarathri was released in 2018 starring Suraj Venjaramoodu.

Notes

References

24. Inquiry Report of the Fireworks Display Accident on 10.04.2016 at Puttingal Devi Temple Premises,Paravur, Kollam District, Kerala. Inquiry officer - Dr.A.K.Yadav, Joint Chief Controller of Explosives, Chennai. Assessors in Inquiry : Dr.R.Venugopal, Deputy Chief Controller of Explosives, PESO, Hyderabad, Dr.K.B.Radhakrishnan, Professor & Head of the Department of Chemical Engineering, TKM College of Engineering, Kollam, Kerala and Mr.G.M.Reddy, Joint Chief Controller of Explosives, (Retired), PESO.

External links

2016 disasters in India
2016 fires in Asia
Explosions in 2016
Explosions in India
Fires in India
History of Kerala (1947–present)
History of Kollam
Religious building and structure fires
April 2016 events in India
Disasters in Kerala
Building collapses in 2016
Building collapses in India
Building collapses caused by fire
Building and structure fires started by pyrotechnics